Phillip Bryan Schofield (born 1 April 1962) is an English television presenter who works for ITV. He is currently the co-presenter of ITV's This Morning (2002–present) and Dancing on Ice (2006–2014, 2018–present) alongside Holly Willoughby. Schofield gained national attention working for the BBC, first as a continuity presenter for Children's BBC on weekdays from 1985 to 1987. His other television work includes Going Live! (1987–1993), All Star Mr & Mrs (2008–2016), The Cube (2009–2015, 2020–present), Text Santa (2011–2015), and 5 Gold Rings (2017–2020).

Early life
Schofield was born on 1 April 1962 in Oldham, Lancashire. He grew up in Newquay, Cornwall, where he attended Trenance Infant School and Newquay Tretherras School. When he was 15, his first foray into media was a Sunday show on Hospital Radio Plymouth.

After many years of writing letters to the BBC, at 17, Schofield took up the position of bookings clerk and tea boy for BBC Radio at Broadcasting House in London, where he was, at the time, the youngest employee.

Career

Television
Aged 19, Schofield moved with his family to New Zealand, where he made his television debut as the initial presenter of the youth music programme Shazam! on 23 February 1982. He also spent two years working for the Auckland-based radio station Radio Hauraki.

In 1985, he returned to Britain, where he became the first in-vision continuity presenter for Children's BBC on weekdays for two years from September 1985 in what was known as the 'Broom Cupboard'. He left in 1987 to present Going Live! on Saturday mornings between September 1987 and April 1993. From 1988 to 1991, he was the host of the Smash Hits Poll Winners Party, a pop-magazine awards show.

In the early 1990s, Schofield moved to adult-orientated television with various programmes for ITV, such as Schofield's Quest, Schofield's TV Gold and Ten Ball. From 1994 to 1997, he presented Talking Telephone Numbers for five series and in 1996 he hosted a show about remarkable coincidences called One in a Million. He co-authored the book that came out of the series.

He was the subject of This Is Your Life in 1998, when he was surprised by Michael Aspel at the curtain call of the musical Doctor Dolittle at the Hammersmith Apollo in London.

In the following decade, Schofield presented the National Lottery Winning Lines programme for BBC One between June 2001 and October 2004. And between 2002 and 2006, he co-hosted the BBC quiz show Test the Nation with Anne Robinson. In July 2006, he signed an exclusive two-year contract with ITV, reported to have been worth £5 million. The exclusive deal also meant he could no longer present Test the Nation and was replaced by Danny Wallace.

Since 2002, Schofield has been a presenter on the ITV daytime show This Morning replacing John Leslie with Fern Britton until 2009 and with Holly Willoughby who replaced Britton in September that year. In May 2008, Schofield's father, Brian, died from a long-standing heart condition, which led to Schofield taking a break from presenting This Morning. John Barrowman stood in for him until his return.

Starting in 2005, Schofield presented two series of Have I Been Here Before?, a daytime programme where a celebrity attempted to use regression to get in touch with a previous life.

Since 2006, he has presented The British Soap Awards. Between 2006 and 2008, he hosted the programme with Fern Britton but since 2009, alone.

During the run of the ITV reality show I'm a Celebrity...Get Me Out of Here!, he co-hosted the spin-off series I'm a Celebrity, Get Me out of Here! Exclusive with Sheree Murphy. The show lasted one series. In 2006, Schofield presented two episodes of the ITV game show It's Now or Never, before the network cancelled the show, due to poor ratings.

Schofield presented Dancing on Ice on ITV with Holly Willoughby from 2006 until 2011 and Christine Bleakley from 2012 until 2014. It was announced in the summer of 2013 that Dancing on Ice was to come to an end following the 2014 series. Schofield returned to co-present the show in 2018 following ITV's choice to reboot the series after four years away.

Since April 2008, he and Fern Britton hosted a revival of the ITV game show Mr. and Mrs., renamed as All Star Mr & Mrs. In 2010, the show took a break but returned in 2012 without Britton.

From 2009 until 2015, he presented the primetime game show The Cube. Schofield returned to present the show in 2020 following ITV's choice to reboot the series after five years away. He also hosted A Night of Heroes: The Sun Military Awards with Amanda Holden from 2009 until 2014.

In 2010 and 2011, Schofield hosted the annual comedy show The Comedy Annual on ITV. From 2011 until 2015, He co-hosted the Christmas charity show Text Santa on ITV with Christine Lampard in 2011, 2014 and 2015 and Holly Willoughby in 2012 and 2013.

In April 2011 and June 2012, Schofield co-hosted ITV's coverage of the Royal Wedding and the Queen's Diamond Jubilee with Julie Etchingham.

In March 2014, Schofield narrated the one-off ITV2 show Educating Joey Essex. The show was commissioned for a full series which was aired throughout 2014. The show was commissioned for a seven-part second series, filming began in April 2016, and the series aired in summer 2016 with the first episode titled "The Queen's 90th Birthday".

In December 2014, he undertook a live 24-hour TV marathon to raise money for Text Santa, where, as well as appearing on This Morning, he appeared on various other programmes throughout the day, including being a guest panellist on Loose Women.

He presented two series of the primetime game show You're Back in the Room for ITV in 2015 and 2016.

In 2016, he travelled to South Africa with his wife, as part of a series of short clips for This Morning. Following this, ITV aired three 30 minute episodes in a primetime slot, called Schofield's South African Adventure. Since March 2017, he has presented 5 Gold Rings, a new game show format for ITV. In 2017, Schofield presented three-part factual series How To Spend It Well at Christmas with Phillip Schofield in which he tested the latest must-have festive gifts.

Radio
While working as presenter of Going Live!, Schofield was also broadcasting on BBC Radio 1 with a Sunday show (also called Going Live). When Radio 1 started to broadcast in FM stereo in 1988, Schofield was one of the presenters chosen to help with the launch.

In February 2010, Schofield launched Radio Plymouth in Devon.

Theatre
Schofield first performed on the West End stage in 1991, taking over the role of Joseph in Joseph and the Amazing Technicolor Dreamcoat from Jason Donovan. The second musical he performed in was the title role of Doctor Dolittle at the Hammersmith Apollo in London, before touring the UK in 2000. Schofield reprised his role as Joseph for an episode of Ant & Dec's Saturday Night Takeaway in March 2018.

Other ventures

Music
While appearing in Joseph and the Amazing Technicolor Dreamcoat, Schofield was approached to record a cover of "Close Every Door" to be released as a single. The single was released in December 1992 on Polydor Records and peaked at number 27 on the UK Singles Chart.

Wine
Schofield collects Bordeaux wines, an interest kindled by friend Jason Donovan. Asked in 1992 to introduce a compilation video for Donovan, Schofield refused to accept payment. Stock, Aitken and Waterman sent him two cases of Burgundy with a set of tasting notes; he joined the Wine Society two years later.

In 2013, Schofield began writing for the Waitrose Weekend newspaper, and has been the face of wine in their UK stores ever since. Schofield has a separate Twitter account about wine called @SchofeOnWine.

Controversies

David Cameron This Morning interview
On 8 November 2012, Schofield interviewed then prime minister David Cameron on This Morning, and presented him with a list he had obtained from the internet of five people named as paedophiles in connection with the North Wales child abuse scandal. The names of several former senior Conservative politicians were visible on the list. Schofield was widely criticised for his action, with broadcaster Jonathan Dimbleby describing his behaviour as "cretinous". Cameron responded by warning against a witchhunt, "particularly about people who are gay". ITV's director of television, Peter Fincham, said that Schofield was "wrong" in confronting Cameron and said that the broadcaster had agreed to co-operate fully with government regulator Ofcom's investigation into the matter. The investigation was initiated after Ofcom received 415 complaints from viewers. Schofield later apologised, blaming a misjudged camera angle. Schofield and ITV later paid £125,000 compensation to settle a libel suit from one of those falsely accused, Lord McAlpine.

Queen Elizabeth II lying in state 
On 17 September 2022, Schofield and presenter Holly Willoughby drew criticism for not joining The Queue with the public, when filming for This Morning at the lying in state of Queen Elizabeth II in Westminster Hall. ITV said that Schofield was escorted from the press gallery by government staff, and did not file past the Queen's coffin. Social media users contrasted this against the actions of other celebrities such as David Beckham and Susanna Reid, who queued for many hours with members of the general public.

Personal life
Schofield has dual British and New Zealand citizenship. He married his long-term partner Stephanie Lowe in March 1993; the couple have two daughters. 

On 7 February 2020, Schofield came out as gay via a statement posted on one of his Instagram stories, followed up in an interview on This Morning, stating that "with the strength and support of my wife and my daughters, I have been coming to terms with the fact that I am gay". He has said he thought he was bisexual when he married his wife in 1993, but realised later that he was gay.

Honours
He was awarded the Honorary Degree of Doctor of Arts (D.Arts) by the University of Plymouth in 2011.

Filmography

Television

Film

Stage

Bibliography
 One in a Million (with Peter A. Hough, Michael O'Mara Books, 1996) 
 Life is What You Make It (Penguin Books, 2020)

Fun File
 The First Phillip Schofield Fun File (Random House Children's Books, 1988) 
 The Second Phillip Schofield Fun File (Bantam Books, 1989)

Gordon the Gopher
 The Adventures of Gordon T. Gopher (Knight Books, 1989) 
 Phillip Schofield's Gordon T. Gopher Annual (World International Publishing Ltd., 1988)

References

External links
 
 
 Phillip Schofield at itv.com

1962 births
Living people
BBC Radio 1 presenters
English male musical theatre actors
English television presenters
Gay entertainers
ITV people
English LGBT broadcasters
English LGBT entertainers
English gay men
People from Newquay
People from Oldham
Television personalities from Cornwall
Television personalities from Lancashire
Wine writers
20th-century English LGBT people
21st-century English LGBT people